Mexican singer Luis Miguel has recorded material for 20 studio albums and sung songs mostly in Spanish. He has also recorded his music in Italian and Portuguese. His pop music albums mainly consist of soft rock and pop ballad tunes.

Recording history
At age 11, he signed with EMI Music, and released his debut album Un Sol in 1982; it produced his first hit "1+1=2 Enamorados" ("1+1=2 Lovers"). Most of the tracks on the album were written by Javier Santos and Rubén Amado. Mexican singer-songwriter Juan Gabriel wrote two songs for Un Sol: "Mentira" and "Lo Que Me Gusta". Luis Miguel's second studio album, Directo al Corazón, was released later in the year.

Miguel released his third and fourth studio albums, Decídete and Palabra de Honor, in 1983 and 1984, respectively. The songs pn both albums were mostly written by Honorio Herrero, the director of Spanish record label Hispavox. Notable hits from the albums include "Un Rock and Roll Sonó" ("A Rock and Roll Sound"), "La Chica del Bikini Azul" ("The Girl in the Blue Bikini"), "Decídete", and "No Me Puedes Dejar Así". For the Brazilian market, Miguel recorded Portuguese-language versions of Decídete (Decide Amor) and Palabra de Honor (Meu Sonho Perdido). The tracks were adapted into Portuguese by Brazilian composer . The former album also contains Portuguese-language versions of "1+1=2 Enamorados" and "Mentira" which were previously released as singles only.

Miguel made a guest appearance on Scottish singer Sheena Easton's album Todo Me Recuerda a Ti (1984) on the duet "Me Gustas Tal Como Eres", which was composed by Juan Carlos Calderón. The track won the Grammy Award for Best Mexican/Mexican-American Performance in 1985. It was later included on Palabra de Honor. Miguel starred in the 1984 film Ya nunca más and recorded tracks for the film's soundtrack. In the same year, he released También es Rock, an extended play (EP) of rock and roll covers, mainly those originally performed by Elvis Presley.

Miguel participated in the 1985 Sanremo Music Festival in Italy and placed second for his song "Noi Ragazzi di Oggi" ("We Children of Today"). He then recorded Italian-language versions of his songs from Palabra de Honor and a new track, "Il Cielo" ("The Sky"), written by Toto Cutugno and Cristiano Minellono. The songs were included on his compilation album Canta en Italiano  (1985) with Luigi Albertelli translating the recordings in Italian. Miguel appeared as a lead role in the 1985 film Fiebre de amor and sang for the soundtrack from the film. Fellow Mexican entertainer Lucero, who co-stars in the film, performs a duet with Miguel on the soundtrack with the song "Todo el Amor del Mundo".

In 1986, Miguel left EMI and signed with Warner Music following a fallout from his father and his mother's disappearance. He collaborated with Calderón to work on his fifth studio album, Soy Como Quiero Ser, which was released in 1987. The album mainly consists of Spanish-language adaptations of songs first sung in English. "Ahora Te Puedes Marchar" ("You Can Go Away Now"), a cover of Dusty Springfield's "I Only Want to Be with You", became his first song to reach number-one on the Billboard Hot Latin Song chart in the United States. Soy Como Quiero Ser also features two duets, both penned by Calderón: "Sin Hablar" ("Without Speaking") with American singer Laura Branigan and "No Me Puedo Escapar de Ti" ("I Can't Escape From You") with Rocío Banquells.

Miguel worked with Calderón again on the subsequent album Busca una Mujer (1988). Calderón composed the majority of the tracks on the album, including "Fría Como el Viento" ("Cold as the Wind") and "La Incondicional", the lead singles from the album which reached number-one on the Hot Latin Songs in the US. Sacomanni translated the songs in Portuguese as "Fria Como o Vento" and "A Incondicional", which was included in the Brazil edition of Busca una Mujer. Miguel collaborated with Calderón once more to compose tracks on his seventh studio album, 20 Años (1990). "Entrégate" and "Tengo Todo Excepto a Ti", were the lead singles from the album and topped the Hot Latin Songs chart in the US. Calderón adapted The Jackson 5's "Blame It on the Boogie" in Spanish as "Será Que No Me Amas" ("It's Just That You Don't Love Me"), and it became a hit in Mexico.

Facing a contractual deadline to record a new album, Miguel teamed up with Mexican singer-songwriter Armando Manzanero to produce Romance (1991), a collection of twelve boleros that were performed by other artists. Unlike Miguel's previous albums, the music in Romance features strings with arrangements by Bebu Silvetti. The success of the album led to a renewed mainstream interest in the bolero genre. Miguel covers two of Manzanero's songs on the album—"Te Extraño" ("I Miss You") and "No Sé Tú" ("I Don't Know You")—the latter track became his seventh song to reach number-one on the Hot Latin Songs chart and won the Lo Nuestro Award for Pop Song of the Year in 1993. A year later, Miguel recorded a cover of Nino Bravo's "América, América" for the live EP América & en Vivo. He performed it as a tribute to the soldiers who fought in the Gulf War.

Romance was followed by three more albums: Segundo Romance (1994), Romances (1997), and Mis Romances (2001). Between the release of the Romance-themed products, Miguel released Aries, Nada Es Igual... (1996), and Amarte Es un Placer (1999). He performed a duet with Frank Sinatra on Sinatra's album Duets II (1994) on the track "Come Fly with Me". To date, it is his only English-language song that he has commercially released. Miguel recorded "Sueña", the Spanish-language version of "Someday" from Disney's 1996 film The Hunchback of Notre Dame for the Latin American edition of the film's soundtrack and it was included on Nada Es Igual. "Tu Mirada", from Amarte Es un Placer, won the Latin Grammy Award for Best Male Pop Vocal Performance. Miguel concluded the Romance series in 2002 with Mis Boleros Favoritos, a compilation of previously-recorded songs from bolero albums, and recorded a new track, "Hasta Que Vuelvas".

Manzanero collaborated with Miguel on the Romance albums as well as on Amarte Es un Placer and penned original compositions for the artist including "Por Debajo de la Mesa" and "Dormir Contigo", which Manzanero has stated are his favorite songs that he has written. Miguel's 15th studio album, 33 (2003), was a return to the pop music genre. The lead single, "Te Necesito", was written by Juan Luis Guerra and features American a capella group Take 6 on the background vocals. It became Miguel's 16th song to reach number-one on the Hot Latin Songs chart. The following year, Miguel recorded his first mariachi album México en la Piel. Afterwards, he released his greatest hits album in 2005 which contained two original compositions: "Misterios de Amor" and "Si Te Perdiera".

Miguel launched a Christmas album in 2006 titled Navidades. Two years later, he enlisted Spanish songwriter Manuel Alejandro to compose tracks for his 18th studio album, Cómplices. Miguel released his self-titled album in 2010 featuring his familiar up-tempo pop sounds and orchestrated ballads. His single, "Déjà Vu", premiered as a digital download in 2014 but was a commercial failure. After a three-year hiatus, Miguel released ¡México Por Siempre! in 2017, his first disc in seven years and his second mariachi album.

Songs

See also 

Luis Miguel discography

Notes

References

External links 
Luis Miguel discography on AllMusic

Lists of songs recorded by Mexican artists